"Are You Bored Yet?" is a song by American alternative rock band Wallows featuring singer Clairo, released through Atlantic Records on February 1, 2019, as the lead single from their debut album Nothing Happens. The song peaked at number 2 on the Billboard American Alternative Airplay chart and has since reached double-platinum certification by the RIAA.

Background 
Wallows began to work on their debut studio album, Nothing Happens, following the release of their EP Spring.

The band had were inspired to include a female feature on the track after completing a demo version of the single, which used pitched-up vocals from member Braeden Lemasters, and knew Clairo through mutual friends at the time.

Composition 
Dylan Minnette, the group's frontman, described the track as being from "the perspective of someone in a relationship who can see that it's coming to a definite end", whereas the verse performed by Clairo is from the perspective of "the other side of the relationship" and is more optimistic. Band member Cole Preston described the track as "nice, digestible, [and] easy-to-listen-to" in comparison to the other songs from the album.

Musically, "Are You Bored Yet?" is an indie rock song with elements of bedroom pop, with "chiming piano and delicate guitar riffs." Carrine Hen of Melodic Magazine wrote that the song "has a very soft, upbeat sound driven by light synth and piano that will make you feel nostalgic."

Remixes 
On June 14, 2019, Wallows released two remixes of "Are You Bored Yet?" in collaboration with Sachi of indie-rock band Joy Again and Big Data. A third remix, produced by British musician Mura Masa, was released on August 28, 2020. Austin Evanson of Dancing Astronaut described the new electronic arrangement as a "different, yet altogether mellow new environment" when compared to the original.

Music video 
The official music video, directed by Drew Kirsch, premiered alongside the release of the single on February 1, 2019. The video depicts the band members and Clairo performing at a karaoke bar, with members of the audience lip-syncing along to the lyrics of the song and features a cameo from actor Noah Centineo as a bartender.

Personnel 
Adapted from Spotify.

Wallows

 Dylan Minnette - writing, vocals, guitar, keyboard
 Cole Preston - writing, drums, guitar, keyboard, synth
 Braeden Lemasters - writing, backing vocals, guitar

Claire Cottrill - vocals

Charts

Certifications

Release history

References 

2019 songs
2019 singles
Clairo songs
Atlantic Records singles
Song recordings produced by John Congleton
Songs written by Clairo
Wallows songs